Loxostege manualis is a species of moth in the family Crambidae. It is found in Sweden, Germany, Austria, Switzerland, France, Spain, Italy, Hungary, Bosnia and Herzegovina, Romania, Bulgaria, the Republic of Macedonia, Albania, Greece and Russia.

The wingspan is 19–23 mm. Adults are on wing from May to June.

The larvae feed on Achillea millefolium.

References

Moths described in 1832
Pyraustinae
Moths of Europe